During the Second World War, the British Army made extensive use of fictional formations as part of various military deception efforts to inflate their order of battle. The use of such formations was pioneered by Lieutenant-Colonel Dudley Clarke, based within the Mediterranean and Middle East theatre, and later joined by colleagues located in the UK. The initial efforts were small and created a fictional brigade with no long-term goal. As the war progressed, the deception efforts escalated into elaborate plans that included entire notional armies. In total, 36 notional divisions were created although they were not all employed at the same time. Some of these were based on real units that had previously been disbanded.

Clarke's initial order-of-battle deception created the 1st Special Air Service Brigade. This notional formation was aimed to take advantage of Axis fears of British paratrooper forces being based in Egypt, from where they could potentially land behind the front line. It was followed by two separate efforts that created fictitious divisions to hide various weakness of the British forces in the theatre. In 1942, these efforts grew into Operation Cascade, which again sought to hide the weakness of British forces and deter potential Axis aggression.

In 1943, planning began for the Allied reconquest of German-occupied Western Europe. A major deception effort, Operation Bodyguard, was implemented and included forces based within the UK and the Mediterranean. Allied staff based in the UK worked on Operation Fortitude, which aimed to create new fake formations and an entire notional order of battle. The goal of these efforts was to lead the German military into believing substantial forces could attack Norway, and that Normandy landings were a ruse to hide the real attack that would be launched elsewhere by notional forces based in the UK. Within the Mediterranean theatre, Operation Zeppelin was Fortitude's counterpart. It aimed to elaborate on the work undertaken by Operation Cascade and use the notional formations to feign the threat of attacks throughout the Mediterranean area. The fake order of battle was also used to conceal troop movements from the Mediterranean to the UK. While fake divisions were created to supplement Allied forces in British India and Burma, there was no theatre-wide deception effort.

These various deception operations undertook administrative and physical efforts to fool Axis forces into believing these formations existed. This included fake insignia and documents, inflatable tanks, wireless communications, and the deliberate leaking of information, especially via double agents. Within Europe, these efforts convinced the German military that the Allied powers had more divisions than they did. However, similar efforts in Asia were met with mixed success.

Background

Initial efforts

Lieutenant-Colonel Dudley Clarke, who had previously been engaged in various intelligence work and had helped form the Commandos, was assigned to Middle East Command on 19 December 1940. His role was the Personal Intelligence Officer (Special Duties) to Middle East Command's commander-in-chief, General Archibald Wavell. After assisting with Operation Camilla, the deception plan for the reoccupation of British Somaliland, Clarke undertook his first effort to create an entirely fictitious formation.

Operation Abeam was the codename given for the creation of the fictional 1st Special Air Service Brigade. This brigade was placed to notionally support Wavell's attack against Italian forces in the Western Desert campaign, by playing on the Italian concern of potential British airborne forces being in the theatre and that they could be used to land behind the frontline. This was followed by a scaled-up version, in efforts to fool Italian intelligence into believing that a notional 10th Armoured Division was arriving piecemeal in Egypt, where British forces were based. The plan aimed to cover the lack of British armoured forces actually located there.

The first use of deception formations within combat plans came shortly thereafter, in March 1941, when Wavell planned to seize the island of Rhodes. A deception plan was formed to suggest the real target was Scarpanto and that the 1st Special Air Service Brigade would raid Rhodes to distract Axis forces. Due to German reinforcements arriving in Africa, to bolster the Italians, the attack did not occur. On 28 March, Clarke's team became known as Advanced Headquarters 'A' Force, with the 'A' purposely left ambiguous.

Abeam and the 10th Armoured Division had been intended only for short-term use, the first long-term plan was formed in June. Cyprus was potentially at risk of invasion, following the German occupation of Crete. The Cyprus Defense Plan aimed to deter any attack and to buy time to allow actual reinforcements to arrive to bolster the 4,000-man garrison. The deception plan claimed that the garrison was at least 20,000 strong, based around the fictitious 7th Infantry Division (Cyprus). The plan evolved to include additional units, a changing order of battle for the 7th Division, and a notional corps headquarters. These successes prompted the creation of the London Controlling Section, a similar unit to 'A' Force but based in the UK.

Expansion
The lessons learnt during these early order-of-battle deceptions, along with other deception operations undertaken by A Force, resulted in Operation Cascade. The initial objective, outlined in March 1942, was to deter a potential German assault via the Caucasus – if the Germans succeeded in their southern spring offensive inside the Soviet Union – by inflating the British order of battle within the Middle East. The plan called for eight new notional divisions as well as two notional armoured brigades, in addition to the existing notional 1st Special Service Brigade (the actual British strength during this period was 15 divisions). The plan officially began in July and carried on through to 1944, evolving as the situation required and with additional formations added. For example, in March 1943, six further notional British divisions were added.

During 1943, the Allies began planning for a major offensive that aimed to liberate German-occupied France. The planning of this included a deception element that was codenamed Operation Bodyguard. Bodyguard, in turn, consisted of various elements. For the Mediterranean area, the overall deception plan was Operation Zeppelin that aimed to create an Allied threat to various Axis-held territories. To support this, the Allied order of battle needed to be inflated to provide these operations with the necessary forces to create such threats. As a result, Cascade was superseded by Operation Wantage on 6 February 1944. Specifically, Wantage aimed to increase the forces in the Mediterranean by 33 per cent, and double the number of forces based within the Middle East (the latter included the creation of eighteen new notional divisions, six corps, and one army). The efforts conducted by Cascade and Wantage allowed for Operation Foynes, which aimed to conceal the withdrawal of Allied formations from Italy. Eight divisions were withdrawn to the UK, to provide the forming Allied armies with a core of veteran forces for the assault on France. These formations were replaced by three real and four fake divisions. The northern Europe counterpart to Zeppelin was initially codenamed Operation Torrent and then referred to as Appendix Y, based on the section name of the planning documents. This plan then evolved into Operation Mespot and subsequently Operation Fortitude. It was planned by a department called Ops (B) and split into two: Fortitude North, which sought to create a threat towards Scandinavia; and Fortitude South that aimed to make the Germans believe that the invasion of France would take place in the Pas-de-Calais region. These plans aimed to expand the Allied order of battle within the UK in order to provide the forces required to maintain these threats.

Method

Deception formations was not limited to British forces. Notional American, British Indian, Canadian, French, Greek, New Zealand, and South African formations were also fabricated. To create and maintain the illusion of these notional formations, various methods were undertaken. At a basic level, British intelligence purposely leaked information and started rumors that would eventually reach Axis intelligence services. This included planting information to be found by foreign diplomats. The notional formations were given insignia and efforts were made to include them on official documents that contained real formations. It was reasoned that the documentation would help to create a general belief that these fake formations existed, and if captured they would further aid the deception. Insignia was worn by soldiers and painted on vehicles. These were then publicly displayed for willing or unwitting Axis informants. Passes and identity cards were manufactured and then "lost" where they could find their way into Axis hands. Dummy tanks covered in tarpaulins were routed through populated areas, and dummy parachutists were dropped near Cairo to simulate parachute training. Wireless traffic was created for the fictional formations. For the benefit of Axis aerial reconnaissance, dummy tanks, fake tank tracks, and fake camps were constructed and moved around to create the fictitious presence of additional armoured formations. Furthermore, MI5, the British security service, had eliminated the German spy ring within the UK. Thereafter, they operated a series of double agents known as the Double-Cross System. These double agents were used to feed German military intelligence information about real and fake formations, their insignia, movements, and provided entire fictitious orders of battle. Due to Ultra, the breaking of German encrypted communications, the British were able to read German coded messages and verify the success of their efforts.

The notional arrival of Canadian troops in Egypt, as part of the deception effort to increase the British-led presence in the area, provides a case example. Canadian insignias were displayed in various locations in Egypt and within the Mandate of Palestine. In Palestine, British intelligence created an influx of Canadian dollars at various money exchanges, and also requested that Vichy French (pro-Axis) forces in the Middle East remain on the look-out and return (notional) French-Canadian deserters. The success of the Cyprus deception effort was verified via intercepted German communications about the level of British forces on the island. By May 1942, the deception methods had resulted in Axis intelligence overestimating British forces in Africa and the Middle East by 30 per cent. This included three of the notional divisions being verified on the German order of battle of British forces. In November 1942, following the Second Battle of El Alamein, the British military captured numerous German intelligence documents. A Force reviewed these documents and were able to verify an initial success to Operation Cascade, with reference being made to many of their notional units. This had resulted in the Germans overestimating the British armoured strength by 45 per cent and their infantry strength by 40 per cent. Dummy tank formations were repeatedly bombed by the Axis air forces. By 1944, there were 44 real Allied divisions in the Mediterranean area. Due to Cascade and Wantage, German intelligence believed there was in fact around 70.

Impact

Roger Fleetwood-Hesketh, who played a major role in the planning of Fortitude, wrote that captured German maps verified the success of the north and south portions of the deception plan. These maps depicted the location of Allied formations within the UK, the fake order of battles, and notional formations. Mary Barbier, a historian who wrote about the Fortitude deception plan, has questioned its success. She wrote "it is time to consider that the importance of the deception has been overrated", and argued that the plan worked as the Germans held "preconceived ideas about the importance of the Pas De Calais", and that the Allied staff had overestimated the effectiveness of the deception as they held a "preconceived notion of what Fortitude would accomplish". Alfred Jodl, a German general, told interrogators after the end of the war, that major landings were expected in southern France due to the large concentration of forces that the Germans believed had been built-up in Africa. Thaddeus Holt, who wrote about the Allied deception methods, wrote that it was "particularly gratifying ... the puzzlement expressed by one German general" who asked why the notional 5th Airborne Division had not been used in the Allied Spring 1945 offensive in Italy.

Similar deceptions were conducted in Asia. However, efforts to operate Bodyguard-like deception were thwarted by the lack of a defined Allied strategy as the British, Americans, and Chinese all held different agendas and goals. Changing objectives also hindered the development of any strategic deception plan to dupe the Empire of Japan. In June 1944, the British captured Japanese documents dated from November 1943, which indicated that the Japanese believed that there were  Allied divisions in Southeast Asia and British India, when the actual strength was around 13. Despite the belief in the deception efforts that had created the inflated order of battle, the attempt to use these formations to influence Japanese planning and actions had little impact.

Armies

Corps

Divisions

Independent brigades

Notes
 Footnotes

 Citations

References

Further reading

 

Military units and formations of the British Empire in World War II
Fictional units of World War II